Himasha Liyanage (born 15 September 1996) is a Sri Lankan cricketer. He made his first-class debut for Sri Lanka Army Sports Club in the 2016–17 Premier League Tournament on 2 December 2016. He made his List A debut for Badulla District in the 2016–17 Districts One Day Tournament on 22 March 2017. He made his Twenty20 debut for Sri Lanka Army Sports Club in the 2017–18 SLC Twenty20 Tournament on 24 February 2018. In August 2021, he was named in the SLC Blues team for the 2021 SLC Invitational T20 League tournament.

References

External links
 

1996 births
Living people
Sri Lankan cricketers
Badulla District cricketers
Sri Lanka Army Sports Club cricketers
Cricketers from Colombo